The women's 220 yards at the 1962 British Empire and Commonwealth Games as part of the athletics programme was held at the Perry Lakes Stadium on Monday 26 November and Thursday 29 November 1962.

22 runners competed in four heats in the first round, with the top three runners from each heat qualifying for the semifinals. There were two semifinals, and only the top three from each heat advanced to the final.

The event was won by England's Dorothy Hyman in 23.8 seconds, who also won the 100 yard event earlier in the meet. Hyman finished ahead of the Australian pair of Joyce Bennett and Margaret Burvill. It was the first time since 1938 that this event was not won by an Australian.

Records

Round 1

Heat 1

Heat 2

Heat 3

Heat 4

Semifinals

Semifinal 1

Semifinal 2

Final

References

Women's 220 yards
1962